Avalon is the debut solo album by American musician Anthony Green released on 5 August 2008 on Photo Finish Records.

Avalon features guest appearances from Keith Goodwin, Tim Arnold, and Dan Schwartz of Good Old War, and Green began a US tour to coincide with the release. Avalon was leaked in its entirety on 1 August 2008, four days before its official release.

Avalon is being made available on vinyl LP with a package including the limited vinyl LP and a Digital Remix CD of Avalon with remixes created by Colin Frangicetto, Green's bandmate in Circa Survive.

Track listing

CD video extras
Dear Child (I've Been Dying To Reach You) Making of the Video - 3-minute-long behind the scenes
Avalon - Making of the Album - 10-minute-long documentary

References

2008 albums
Anthony Green (musician) albums